Since the time of the Oxford Movement in the Church of England, there have been organizations whose purpose is the propagation of the Catholic Faith within the Anglican Communion. Each of these societies champions one aspect of Ritualism and Anglican doctrine which otherwise is not emphasized by the Anglican churches as a whole. Mostly, these are groups or organisations that are part of the High Church or Anglo-Catholic movement. Many of them are members or associates of the Catholic societies of the Church of England.

List of societies
Additional Curates Society
Affirming Catholicism
Anglican Priests Eucharistic League – (see External links)
Anglican Society of Our Lady
Association of Priests Associate of the Holy House of Walsingham
The Catholic League
The Church Union
Companions of the Shrine of Our Lady of Willesden
Company of Servers
Confraternity of the Blessed Sacrament
Cost of Conscience
Credo Cymru
The Federation of Catholic Priests
Forward in Faith
Glastonbury Pilgrimage Association
Guild of All Souls
Guild of Servants of the Sanctuary – (see External links)
Saint Martin's League
The Society for Sacramental Mission
The Seabury Society – (see External links)
Society of Catholic Priests
Society of Mary
Society of the Holy Cross
Society of King Charles the Martyr
Society of Our Lady of Walsingham
Society of Sacramental Socialists – (see External links)
The Society under the patronage of Saint Wilfrid and Saint Hilda
Sodality of Mary, Mother of Priests
Sodality of the Precious Blood

External links

Anglican Priests Eucharistic League
Guild of Servants of the Sanctuary
Cost of Conscience
Society of Mary
Glastonbury Pilgrimage Association
Forward in Faith
Credo Cymru
Church Union
Catholic League
Society of The Holy Cross (SSC)
Society of King Charles the Martyr
Society of Catholic Priests
Society of Our Lady of Walsingham
Additional Curates Society
The Seabury Society

Anglicanism
Anglo-Catholicism

Church of England lists